Jacob Steen Christensen (born 25 June 2001), simply known as Jaxe, is a Danish professional footballer who plays for FC Nordsjælland in the Danish Superliga.

Club career 
Jaxe played for Akademisk Boldklub (AB) before moving to FC Nordsjælland at the age of 12. In preparation for the 2018–19 season, he practiced with the first team. He was later permanently promoted to the first team by head coach Kasper Hjulmand. 

On 15 July 2018, the first matchday of the new season, he made his debut at the age of 17 in a 1–1 draw against Esbjerg fB in the Danish Superliga, when he came on for Benjamin Hansen in the 73rd minute of the game. On 1 October, he signed a contract extension, keeping him a part of Nordsjælland until 2021. Jaxe established himself as a substitute and made 22 league appearances during his first season, in which he did not score. 

In the following season – 2019–20 – Jaxe made his breakthrough as a starter. On 31 August 2019, he scored his first goal in the Superliga in a 2–1 home win over Hobro IK. During the season, he made 32 league appearances in which he scored one goal.

References

External links
 

Living people
2001 births
Danish men's footballers
Denmark youth international footballers
Danish Superliga players
Akademisk Boldklub players
FC Nordsjælland players
Association football midfielders
Footballers from Copenhagen
Denmark under-21 international footballers